Adelaide United Football Club is an Australian professional association football club based in Adelaide, South Australia. The club was formed in 2003. They became the first South Australian team to play in the A-League. Adelaide United's first National Soccer League match was against the Brisbane Strikers, and they met their 25th and most recent different league opponent, Macarthur FC, for the first time in the 2020–21 A-League season. The team that Adelaide United have played most in league competition is Melbourne Victory, who they first met in the 2005–06 A-League season; the 28 defeats from 60 meetings is more than they have lost against any other club. Newcastle Jets have drawn 15 league encounters with Adelaide United, more than any other club. Adelaide United have recorded more league victories against Brisbane Roar than against any other club, having beaten them 25 times out of 55 attempts.

Key
The table includes results of matches played by Adelaide United in the National Soccer League and A-League Men
The name used for each opponent is the name they had when Adelaide United most recently played a league match against them. Results against each opponent include results against that club under any former name.
The columns headed "First" and "Last" contain the first and most recent seasons in which Adelaide United played league matches against each opponent.
P = matches played; W = matches won; D = matches drawn; L = matches lost; Win% = percentage of total matches won
  Clubs with this background and symbol in the "Opponent" column are Adelaide United's divisional rivals in the current season.
  Clubs with this background and symbol in the "Opponent" column are defunct.

All-time league record
Statistics correct as of the match played 20 January 2023. All matches played in the 2019–20 A-League after the postponement due to the COVID-19 are excluded in the home and away records as they are treated as neutral venues.

Footnotes

References

League record by opponent
Australian soccer club league records by opponent